Nicholas W. Thomas (May 23, 1810 – March 27, 1864) was the Mayor of Cincinnati, Ohio, from 1857 to 1859.

He was born in Jenkintown (now part of Philadelphia), Philadelphia County, Pa., on May 23, 1810. He was the son of Joseph and Eleanor Thomas.  He married Arminda Barnard; together they had four children.
 
He was a member of the Whig Party (United States).

Mayor Thomas died March 27, 1864.  His interment was at Spring Grove Cemetery, in Cincinnati, Ohio.

References

External links 

Mayors of Cincinnati
Politicians from Philadelphia
Ohio Whigs
19th-century American politicians
Burials at Spring Grove Cemetery
1810 births
1864 deaths